Guerra de Chistes (Joke Wars) is a television show from the Mexican TV network Telehit hosted by Radames de Jesus, Juan Carlos Casasola, Juan Carlos El Borrego Nava and La Wanders Lover, they tell jokes throughout the program and have special guests on every show.

Guests 
Full episodes with their respective guests

References
 Guerra de Chistes official website
 Guerra de Chistes official minisite

Mexican comedy television series